Klaas Bruinsma (February 1, 1931, Easterein – October 29, 2018, Drachten) was a West Frisian language translator of historical works from Dutch, Spanish and Greek, among others.

He translated the works Karel ende Elegast and Beatrijs. In 1993 he was awarded the Obe Postma prize for his translation from Greek of the tragedies of Sophocles. In 2005 he obtained this prize for the second time for his translation of Virgil's Georgics and especially for his translations of the Iliad and the Odyssey of Homer.

Until his retirement, Bruinsma was a lecturer of English and history at the Ichthus College in Drachten, amongst others.

References

External links
 Information about Bruinsma from Tresoar

1931 births
2018 deaths
Dutch translators
Translators from Dutch
Translators from Greek
Translators from Spanish
Translators to West Frisian
People from Littenseradiel
Translators of Homer
Translators of Virgil